Kim Hellberg (born 1 February 1988) is a Swedish former professional footballer who played as a midfielder. He is the manager of the Allsvenskan club IFK Värnamo.

Coaching career
Kim made his first season as manager in 2011 when he won Division 5 with Kimstad GoIF at the age of 23. He was appointed manager of Kuddby IF in 2013 at age 25, Kuddby played in Swedish division 5 (the 7 tier) and Kim made the team advance to division 3 in just 3 years,  Kuddby made a good first season in division 3 finishing 6th.
Kim left Kuddby at the end of 2016 when and was appointed manager of IF Sylvia in division 2. Kim's father Stefan Hellberg is assistant coach at IFK Norrköping and has also been manager for IF Sylvia.
In 2020 Kim joined his father and became assistant manager of IFK Norrköping.
In December 2021 he was appointed manager of IFK Värnamo.

Honours
Kimstad GoIF
Division 5 Mellersta 2011 
Kuddby IF
Division 5 Östra 2014
Östgötacupen runner's up 2014 
Division 4 Östra 2015
IF Sylvia
Division 2 Södra Svealand 2018

References

1988 births
Living people
Swedish footballers
Sportspeople from Norrköping
Association football midfielders
Allsvenskan managers
IFK Värnamo managers
Footballers from Östergötland County